HMS A3 was an  submarine built for the Royal Navy in the first decade of the 20th century. She sank in 1912. The wreck is a Protected Wreck managed by Historic England.

Design and description
A3 was a member of the first British class of submarines, although slightly larger, faster and more heavily armed than the lead ship, . They displaced  on the surface and  submerged. The A-class submarines had a crew of 2 officers and 9 ratings.

For surface running, the boats were powered by a single 16-cylinder  Wolseley petrol engine that drove one propeller shaft. When submerged the propeller was driven by a  electric motor. They could reach  on the surface and  underwater.

The boats were armed with two 18-inch (45 cm) torpedo tubes in the bow. They could carry a pair of reload torpedoes, but generally did not as doing so that they had to compensate for their weight by an equivalent weight of fuel.

Construction and career
A3 was laid down by Vickers, Sons & Maxim as Yard No.295 at Barrow-in-Furness on 6 November 1902 and was launched on 9 May 1903. She was commissioned on 13 July 1904. She primarily served as a coastal defense and training submarine in her over seven years of service.

On 2 February 1912, A3, along with several other submarines dispatched from the port of Gosport, conducted training exercises on target ships in the Solent. Whilst attacking the depot ship , the semi-submerged A3 accidentally collided with its target two miles south-west of the East Princessa Buoy in the eastern Solent. Its rudder and propeller were both disabled, and the holed submarine sank immediately with all 14 hands lost. The King sent his immediate condolences to the families of the lost seamen.

The submarine was raised from the bottom on 11 March and was brought into the south lock of Portsmouth dockyard the following day, slung below a salvage lighter; the lock was pumped dry so that the 14 bodies could be recovered and the damages surveyed.

In July 2016 the wreck of A3 was officially designated as a protected site.

Notes

References

External links
 MaritimeQuest HMS A3 Pages
 'Submarine losses 1904 to present day' - Royal Navy Submarine Museum 
 "HMS A3" National Heritage List for England

 

A-class submarines (1903)
British submarine accidents
Ships built in Barrow-in-Furness
1903 ships
Royal Navy ship names
Maritime incidents in 1912
Submarines sunk in collisions
Warships lost with all hands
Ships sunk as targets
Lost submarines of the United Kingdom
Shipwrecks in the English Channel
Wreck diving sites in the United Kingdom